Sun Qimeng (March 2, 1911 – March 2, 2010) was a Chinese politician, who served as the vice chairperson of the Standing Committee of the National People's Congress.

References 

1911 births
2010 deaths
Vice Chairpersons of the National People's Congress